The Thalit massacre took place in Thalit village (Médéa, near Ksar el Boukhari), some 70 km from Algiers, on April 3-4, 1997 during the Algerian Civil War. Fifty-two out of the 53 inhabitants were killed by having their throats cut during a 12-hour rampage. The homes of the villagers were burned down afterward. The attack was attributed to "Islamist guerrillas", thought to be affiliated with the Armed Islamic Group.

See also
 Beheading in Islam
 List of massacres during the Algerian Civil War
 List of massacres in Algeria

References

1997 in Algeria
April 1997 events in Africa
Algerian massacres of the 1990s
Conflicts in 1997
Islamism-related beheadings
Massacres in 1997